George Crawford   was a Major League Baseball outfielder.

External links

Major League Baseball outfielders
Philadelphia Athletics (AA) players
19th-century baseball players